Conophytum minutum, called the lesser dumpling, is a species of flowering plant in the genus Conophytum, native to the western Cape Provinces of South Africa. It has gained the Royal Horticultural Society's Award of Garden Merit.

Subtaxa
The following varieties are currently accepted:
Conophytum minutum var. lisabeliae S.A.Hammer

References

minutum
Endemic flora of South Africa
Flora of the Cape Provinces
Plants described in 1922
Taxa named by N. E. Brown
Taxa named by Adrian Hardy Haworth